The Diocese of Eastern Kowloon is one of the three dioceses under the Hong Kong Sheng Kung Hui. Its territory covers most part of eastern Kowloon and eastern New Territories. Holy Trinity Cathedral, cathedral of the diocese, was established in 1890, making it one of the oldest Anglican churches in Hong Kong. Incumbent bishop, Timothy Kwok, was elected on 30 March 2014 and enthroned on 23 November 2014, replacing the outgoing bishop, Louis Tsui.

Introduction 
The Diocese was constituted in conformity with the traditions of the Anglican Communion. Since its establishment, it has cooperated with other two Dioceses in many issues under the metropolitical body of the Hong Kong Sheng Kung Hui, the General Synod.

As a member of the Province, the Diocese confesses the faith revealed in the Scriptures of the Old and New Testaments; the Apostles’, Nicene and Athanasian Creeds. The Diocese has preserved the old roots of the Christian faith through its historic Anglican traditions: the Book of Common Prayer and the holy orders.

Sharing the same missions and goals with other Dioceses in Hong Kong, the Diocese aimed to spread the good news across Hong Kong through pastoral care and evangelism. The Province has devoted itself to fulfill the Christian responsibilities through mutual cooperation of the Dioceses.

Land reclamation has created new lands from Hung Hom to Kowloon Bay to enable future developments. With height restrictions being removed soon after operations of the former Kai Tak Airport was ceased, creation of a new infrastructural network will increase population and help economic development. Thus, the Diocese has bore more responsibilities in different sectors.

The nucleus of the Diocese is much situated in Kowloon City, a district rich in historical and cultural heritage, strives to remind people of the traditional Chinese culture and traditions.

Churches

Parishes 
 Holy Trinity Cathedral
 Christ Church
 Holy Carpenter Church
 Church of the Good Shepherd
 St. Mark's Church
 Calvary Church
 St. Barnabas' Church
 Kindly Light Church
 Holy Spirit Church
 Church of St. John the Baptist
 Church of the Holy Word
 Church of Our Saviour
 St. Titus' Church

Missions 
 Holy Wisdom Church
 Resurrection Church
 Shatin Anglican Church
 Church of the Transfiguration
 St. Augustine's Chapel

Administration 
Several committees were established under the Diocesan Synod to oversee the Diocese-at-large and manage the Diocesan affairs:
 The Standing Committee
 The Finance Committee
 The Committee on Christian Nurture and Pastoral Care
 The Youth Committee
 The Committee for Mission
 The Committee on Religion Education

Bishops 
 1998–2013: Louis Tsui
 2014–present: Timothy Kwok

Louis Tsui

Louis Tsui Tsan-Sang (born 12 April 1943) is a retired Anglican bishop who served as the first Bishop of Eastern Kowloon (diocesan bishop of the Diocese of Eastern Kowloon) from its creation in 1998 until his retirement in 2013. Tsui was consecrated a bishop on 30 November 1995 at St John's Cathedral (Hong Kong) and served as an area bishop for Kowloon East & New Territories East (in the Diocese of Hong Kong and Macao) in anticipation of the diocese's split. He became diocesan bishop of Eastern Kowloon on the diocese's erection in 1998, and served until his retirement at the end of 2013.

See also 

 Diocese of Hong Kong Island
 Diocese of Western Kowloon
 List of Anglican churches in Hong Kong
 Anglican Communion

References

External links 
 Diocese of Eastern Kowloon
 Hong Kong Sheng Kung Hui

 
Hong Kong Sheng Kung Hui
Eastern Kowloon